Igutsaat Fjord, also known as Igutsait Fjord, is a fjord in the King Frederick VI Coast, Kujalleq municipality, southern Greenland.

Deposits of rare minerals have been found in this fjord, as well as in neighbouring Kangerluluk.

Geography
Igutsaat Fjord extends in a roughly east–west direction for about 35 km between Avaqqat Kangerluat to the north and Kangerluluk Fjord to the south. It is very similar in structure to neighboring Kangerluluk but shorter. To the east the fjord opens into the North Atlantic Ocean between Cape Olfert Fischer in the south and Cape Herluf Trolle in the north. The fjord becomes wide in its middle part and has a large active glacier at its head and on its sides.

Uummannaarsuk —not to be confused with Uummannaarsuk off the mouth of Avaqqat Kangerluat 15 km further north— is a small island located about 2.8 km to the NE of Cape Olfert Fischer, the point on the southern side of the fjord's mouth. 

The Igutsaat Paleo-Eskimo archaeological site is located by the shore at the entrance of the fjord on its northern side.

Mountains

Bibliography
John Grocott, Vertical Coupling and Decoupling in the Lithosphere, Geological Society, pp 238

See also
List of fjords of Greenland

References

External links
New insights on the north-eastern part of the Ketilidian orogen in South-East Greenland

Fjords of Greenland